Jack Stephen John Sims (born 10 March 1999) is an English footballer who plays as a goalkeeper for National League South club Braintree Town.

Career
Sims started his career with local side, Canvey Island before spending six years at Southend United and then eventually joining Blackpool as a 16-year old. Prior to making his Football League debut in December 2019, during a 1–0 defeat to Acrrington Stanley, replacing an injured Jak Alnwick with 60 minutes remaining, Sims enjoyed loan spells at both Skelmersdale United and Lancaster City (where he earned the player of the season award)  between 2017 and 2019. At the conclusion of the 2020–21 campaign, Sims was released upon the expiry of his contract.

In October 2021, he made the move to National League South side, Welling United and went onto 24 times in all competitions winning 3 consecutive player of the months in the process before joining Braintree Town ahead of the 2022–23 campaign.

Career statistics

References

External links
Jack Sims at Soccerbase

1999 births
Living people
People from Southend-on-Sea
Association football goalkeepers
English footballers
Canvey Island F.C. players
Southend United F.C. players
Blackpool F.C. players
Skelmersdale United F.C. players
Lancaster City F.C. players
Welling United F.C. players
Braintree Town F.C. players
English Football League players
Northern Premier League players
National League (English football) players